Grimmelshausen-Preis is a literary prize in Germany, which is awarded since 1993 on every two years. The prize is named after Hans Jakob Christoffel von Grimmelshausen, author of Simplicius Simplicissimus, a famous German book. The prize money is €10,000.

Laureates 
 1993: Ruth Klüger – weiter leben
 1995: Alban Nikolai Herbst – Wolpertinger oder Das Blau
 1997: Michael Köhlmeier – Telemach
 1999: Robert Menasse – Schubumkehr
 2001: Adolf Muschg – Sutters Glück
 2003: Brigitte Kronauer – Teufelsbrück; sponsorship award: Ricarda Junge – Silberfaden
 2005: Dieter Forte – Auf der anderen Seite der Welt; sponsorship award: Jagoda Marinić – Russische Bücher
 2007: Feridun Zaimoğlu – Leyla; sponsorship award: Silke Scheuermann – Die Stunde zwischen Hund und Wolf
 2009: Reinhard Jirgl – Die Stille; sponsorship award: Claudia Gabler – Die kleinen Raubtiere unter ihrem Pelz'
 2011: Peter Kurzeck – Vorabend; Förderpreis: Annika Scheffel – Ben 2013: Ulrike Edschmid – Das Verschwinden des Philip S.; sponsorship award: Marie T. Martin – Luftpost 2015: Robert Seethaler – Ein ganzes Leben; sponsorship award: Verena Boos – Blutorangen 2017: Christoph Hein – Glückskind mit Vater; sponsorship award: Sophie Passmann – Monologe angehender Psychopathen 
 2019: Dörte Hansen – Mittagsstunde; sponsorship award: Nele Pollatschek – Das Unglück anderer Leute 2021: Christoph Nußbaumeder – Die Unverhofften; sponsership award: Sheree Domingo – Ferngespräch''

References

External links
 

German literary awards